Trichromia purpureotincta is a moth in the family Erebidae. It was described by James John Joicey and George Talbot in 1918. It is found in French Guiana, Venezuela, Peru and Bolivia.

References

Moths described in 1918
purpureotincta